The Xingguo–Quanzhou railway or Xingquan railway is a single-track railway line in China.

History 
The section between Xingguo and Qingliu opened on 30 September 2021. The section between Qingliu and Quanzhou opened on 30 December 2022.

Stations

References

Railway lines in China
Railway lines opened in 2021